The 2004 NCAA Division II football season, part of college football in the United States organized by the National Collegiate Athletic Association at the Division II level, began on August 26, 2004, and concluded with the NCAA Division II Football Championship on December 11, 2004 at Braly Municipal Stadium in Florence, Alabama, hosted by the University of North Alabama. The Valdosta State Blazers defeated the Pittsburg State Gorillas, 36–31, to win their first Division II national title.

The Harlon Hill Trophy was awarded to Chad Friehauf, quarterback from Colorado Mines.

Conference changes and new programs

Regional realignment
The South Region was renamed the Southeast Region but stayed the same, while the Northeast Region lost the GLIAC. The West Region lost the GNAC, gained the MIAA, and became the Southwest Region. The new Northwest Region contained the GLIAC and GNAC, plus the NCC and NSIC from the former Midwest Region.

Conference standings

Northeast Region

Southeast Region

Northwest Region

Southwest Region

Conference summaries

Postseason

The 2004 NCAA Division II Football Championship playoffs were the 31st single-elimination tournament to determine the national champion of men's NCAA Division II college football. The championship game was held at Braly Municipal Stadium in Florence, Alabama for the 17th time. This was the first year of a 24-team playoff bracket.

Seeded teams
Albany State
East Stroudsburg
Michigan Tech
Northwest Missouri State
Northwood
Pittsburg State
Shippensburg
Valdosta State

Playoff bracket

* Home team    † Overtime

See also
 2004 NCAA Division I-A football season
 2004 NCAA Division I-AA football season
 2004 NCAA Division III football season
 2004 NAIA football season

References